Palisades Village is a local shopping village located in Pacific Palisades, California, in the downtown area of the neighborhood known as the "Village", from which the shopping center derives its name.

Overview
In contrast to a typical shopping mall, Palisades Village is an outdoor shopping center designed to look like a typical American main street with an array of smaller storefronts and mid to high-end boutiques, rather than a collection of stores centered around anchor department stores like the nearby Westfield Century City and The Grove at Farmers Market shopping malls. The majority of stores in the Village are women-owned businesses, and most are small chains with few locations. Some of the larger chains who have storefronts in the Village operate smaller than average locations, such as Sephora Studio and Chanel Beauty.

History

1923-2015
When members of the Chautauqua movement first developed the new community of Pacific Palisades in 1923, they placed a small park in the heart of the village (that would later become known as the village green), and they commissioned the Olmstead Brothers (an architect duo from Brookline, Massachusetts) to design the village and business center that would serve as the downtown area for the new community.

The business district of the Palisades was centered around the historic Business Block building located between Antioch and Sunset.

Development process

Retailers such as Trader Joe's, Whole Foods, and what would've been the first Los Angeles location of San Francisco-based chain Bi-Rite Market were under consideration to open in the village. The development received its final approval from the city on June 21, 2016, allowing demolition work along Swarthmore Avenue to proceed and construction work to begin. Los Angeles City Councilman Mike Bonin, who represents the neighborhood, said at the time that Palisades Village “will revitalize downtown Palisades and give the neighborhood the thriving community center it deserves.” The downtown area of the Palisades had been described by some as “run-down”. The construction of Palisades Village took more than two years to complete and cost more than $200 million.

Grand opening
In March 2018, Amazon Books confirmed rumors that they would open their second Los Angeles location in Palisades Village. This is the first bookstore to open in the Palisades since to closing of local mainstay Village Books in 2011 after 14 years of operation.

On September 20, 2018, a black-tie gala was held to celebrate the grand opening of Palisades Village. Notable people in attendance included John Legend, Charlize Thereon, Mindy Kaling, Michael Keaton, Jon M. Chu, Rita Wilson, Molly Sims, Kate Beckinsale, and Rachel Zoe.

Former Honorary Mayor and longtime Palisades resident, comedian and actor Kevin Nealon served as master of ceremonies, and said about his hosting of the event, “A lot of people say, ‘How do you know Rick? How did you get roped into doing this?’” quipped Nealon. “Well, I do a lot of these black-tie shopping experience openings. I’m the best at it, and Rick saw me at the opening of a strip mall down at Pico and Barrington. It was actually not a strip mall; it was more of the opening of a nail salon, and Rick was coming out from getting a mani-pedi. And we talked and he told me about this and I said, ‘Call me when it’s ready,’ never thinking it would be ready. But, heh, heh, it is ready as you can see.” Nelson later quipped, "Here’s why, ladies and gentlemen; because this is like being a comic on a cruise ship,” he said. “If you bomb on a cruise ship, you’ve got to stay in your cabin for the rest of the cruise. If I bomb here, if I don’t get a standing ovation, I can’t come back to this great shopping experience here. I’ll have to stay at home."

The event included an on-stage appearance by then current Co-honorary Mayors Janice and Billy Crystal, followed by a video presentation showing time-lapse footage of the construction of the shopping center. After the roast-turned-awards-show dinner, EGOT-winner John Legend took the stage for a half-hour musical performance that had attendees enthusiastically up on their feet and dancing between the tables. His set was followed up by a fireworks display and a post-event performance by Jason McGee & the Choir.

2019- present

On August 15, 2019 Amazon Studios organized an event at Palisades Village to promote their series The Marvelous Mrs. Maisel. Businesses in the village offered promotional items for "1959 prices" for one day only until they ran out of supply. Promotions included 51-cent movie tickets that Bay Theatre by Cineopolis was giving away. Most showings were said to have been taken by 12:30 p.m., although at 5 p.m., there were said to still be several tickets left for a 10:30 p.m. showing of “The Farewell.” See's Candy offered 1-pound boxes of candy for only $1.50, and by 11:30, all 250 boxes for sale as part of the event sold out. Gornick and Drucker offered $3 haircuts, people were already being scheduled into the afternoon at 10:15 in the morning. About 72 men were said to have received the discounted haircuts. Hank's sold Reuben sandwiches for $0.85 each, and McConnell's ice cream shop sold a single scoop of ice cream for $0.25.

Shops

As of February 2021, the following shops have a location in the Palisades Village:

Dining
 

As of February 2021, the following restaurants and eateries have a location in the Palisades Village:

Former tenants

General Porpoise

General Porpoise, a Seattle-based doughnut shop operated by chef Renee Erickson and offering sufganiyot, jelly doughnuts, and other filled doughnuts with fillings such as its signature roasted lemon curd doughnut, opened its first location outside the Seattle area in the Palisades Village on opening day. Little more than six months after opening, General Porpoise closed its doors on March 26, 2019, after lower than expected sales.

Design
Each building in Palisades Village was designed by a different architect, to create the look and feel of a longstanding downtown shopping district, so that no two buildings adjacent to each other looked alike. As part of the design process of the development, the design team traveled to some of the nation's most pedestrianized city streets, including Fillmore Street in San Francisco and Newbury Street in Boston, in order to study storefront depths, widths, frontage, and architecture mix. They drew from their surroundings of "The Village" neighborhood of the Palisades' “California Coastal” architecture to create a shopping village lined with landscaped balconies and open patios. All the walkways and paths in Palisades Village are paved with brick pavers, which is a first in the Los Angeles area. The street lamps used in the village were inspired by those Rick Caruso saw during his travels in St. Tropez. Each building's was staggered and no two adjacent buildings are the same. A residential architect was hired to design the façades of residence-facing storefronts.

Sustainability
Palisades Village is the "first LEED Gold certified ground-up business district" in the state of California. During construction of the complex, 120,000 cubic yards of soil were repurposed for a park that would later become the village green. The parking garage uses all-LED lighting, which reduces energy by 90 percent, and also features charging for 30 electric cars, with the potential to scale this up to 100. Permavoid and biofiltration systems to drain storm water, purity it for later use and store it under the village green, which results in the water-usage of development being almost nonexistent. A village-wide solar array generates about 800,000 watts of power that goes back into the local power grid every day.

Services
Prior to the COVID-19 pandemic, Palisades Village had a bike share project that let shoppers and residents borrow bicycles is enabled by a concierge program that delivers packages to their home or cars.

Village green

Overview
The Village Green is a small privately owned park located at 15280 Sunset Boulevard, between Swarthmore and Antioch Avenues in the center of Palisades Village.

The tree-lined park features a benches, fountain and lawn area. The park is supported solely by donations and maintained by volunteers, it also hosts community events and is home to 77 different tree and plant species to help satisfy Palisadians concerns about light and noise pollution. In 2019, the Allied Artists of the Santa Monica Mountains and Seashore hosted a landscape art sale and exhibition featuring local artists at the green.

History
The Village Green is on the site of the original public park founded in 1923 which was later leased to Standard Oil for use as a gas station in 1945. Some local residents campaigned for the restoration of the Village Green Park for years. Finally in 1968, the Pacific Palisades Chamber of Commerce contacted the Standard Oil and begaN to negotiate a closure of the filling station and restoration of the former park upon the expiration of their lease fornthe property beginning in June 1972. The 15-member Pacific Palisades Community Council established a 5-person subgroup called that was called "The Village Green Committee". The purpose of this committee was to look into purchasing and restoring the property to its former use as a village green.

Members of this committee included Robert McMillin, president; Margaret Wylie and Wally Miller, vice presidents; Arvin "Pete" Arerns, treasurer;  Bob Abernethy, NBC News correspondent who was also serving as Honorary Mayor at that time. The Village Green Committee signed a lease which gave them the option to buy the lot if it could raise enough money from the community.

On October 1, 1972, the fundraising drive began and in less than three months Palisadians raised almost $70,000, which at that time was a large sum of money, allowing the Palisades Community Council to purchase the lot and restore the Village Green to its former glory for the first time in almost 30 years.

Of the funds raised, $46,000 was used towards the purchase of the village green and the rest paid for hiring an architect to design the park. The basic idea of the Green was that it should be a place to be enjoyed from within and admired from a distance. This meant walkways, benches, trees and flowers, as well as grass. There was to be a flag pole, water feature, and a drinking fountain. The only thing that was not accomplished upon the completion of the green was the water feature due to the project going over budget and a subsequent lack of funds. The fountain was later installed 17 years later in 1990.

The community was said to have worked hard and worked together to complete the green. Articles of Incorporation and Bylaws were drawn and the Village Green Committee was formally certified as a California non-profit corporation in 1973. The Palisades Village Green was formally dedicated and opened to the public on August 17, 1973. The Village Green Committee had originally planned to handover ownership of the Village Green to the City of Los Angeles when it was finished due to the legal responsibility and cost of maintenance involved. However the committee eventually decided to retain their ownership of the property. To this day, it is still owned by the Village Green Committee and managed by a volunteer Board of Directors made up of members of the community. The Palisades Village was developed around the Village Green and it is now surrounded by storefronts that are a part of the shopping district.

Celebrity sightings
Since opening its doors, Palisades Village has played host to a large number of celebrities. Since opening, movie stars such as Adam Sandler, Jennifer Garner, John Legend, Kevin Nealon, Billy Crystal, Kate Beckinsale have been spotted shopping there, among others.

See also

Brentwood Country Mart
The Grove at the Original Farmer's Market
Rodeo Drive
The Americana at Brand
Westfield Century City

References

External links
 

Commercial buildings in Los Angeles
Pedestrian malls in the United States
Shopping malls on the Westside, Los Angeles
2018 establishments in California
Landmarks in Los Angeles
Pacific Palisades, Los Angeles
Shopping malls established in 2018
Ersatz downtowns